Frece or de Frece is a surname. Notable people with the surname include: 

Lauri de Frece (1880–1921), English actor and singer
Richard Frece (born 1975), Austrian diver
Sara Frece (born 1984), Slovenian racing cyclist
Walter de Frece (1870–1935), British theatre impresario and politician